Bijayshree Routray (28 July 1953 – 2 June 2021) was a politician from Odisha, India.

Biography
He represented the Basudevpur from 1990 until 2019.

Routray died from COVID-19 at age 67 in Bhubaneswar during the COVID-19 pandemic in Odisha.

References

1953 births
2021 deaths
People from Bhadrak district
Odisha politicians
Biju Janata Dal politicians
Janata Dal politicians
State cabinet ministers of Odisha
Place of birth missing
Deaths from the COVID-19 pandemic in India